John Gould Moyer (July 12, 1893 – January 21, 1976) was a United States Navy Rear admiral, and the governor of American Samoa from June 5, 1942 to February 8, 1944. He was born in Chicago, Illinois, but lived in both Indiana and Hawaii for much of his life. Moyer was admitted to the United States Naval Academy on June 16, 1910, and became an Ensign shortly upon graduation. He became a Commander in 1934, a Captain in 1939, and eventually a Rear admiral. During his governorship, Moyer recommended the tour of duty of the men under his command be reduced, and took over command of the United States Marines barracks previously under the control of Brigadier general Henry Louis Larsen.

Life
Moyer was born in Chicago, Illinois. He was born to Eva Gould Moyer; his grandfather was a longtime district judge in Indiana. Moyer lived in Delphi, Indiana for much of his early life. He died in Honolulu, Hawaii at the age of 82.

Naval career
Moyer was admitted to the United States Naval Academy on June 16, 1910. As an Ensign, he served on the USS South Carolina) in 1917.  He was promoted to the rank of Commander in 1934, and President of the United States Franklin Roosevelt recommended Moyer for the rank of Captain in 1939. He eventually became a Rear Admiral, and retired on June 30, 1949.

Governorship
Moyer took the office of Governor of American Samoa on June 5, 1942. During his governorship, Moyer suggested the tour of duty for military personnel in American Samoa be reduced from 18 to 12 months, believing that "the climate is bad for most Caucasians". As the Pacific War drew westward, Moyer took control of the United States Marine barracks on the island, a command previously held by Henry Louis Larsen, a man with the short-lived position of Military Governor of Tutuila. Moyer ceded the office to Captain Allen Hobbs on February 8, 1944.

References

United States Navy admirals
Governors of American Samoa
United States Naval Academy alumni
Politicians from Chicago
1893 births
1976 deaths
United States Navy personnel of World War I
United States Navy personnel of World War II
People from Delphi, Indiana
Military personnel from Illinois